Dwight Douglas Furnas (December 11, 1959 – March 2, 2012) was an American professional wrestler and powerlifter. He was an APF National and World Powerlifting Champion, who set multiple world records in the 275 pound weight class. As a wrestler, Furnas worked for, among other promotions, American majors World Championship Wrestling (WCW), Extreme Championship Wrestling (ECW), and World Wrestling Federation (WWF) best known for being part of the tag team The Can-Am Express with tag team partner Phil Lafon. Furnas was also a longtime mainstay of All Japan Pro Wrestling.

Powerlifting career
Before becoming a lifter, Furnas was a promising American football player, who had won the High School State and the Junior College National Championships and even made the Denver Broncos training camp. Upon starting powerlifting, Furnas initially campaigned as a 242-pound lifter. At a height of 5'10" he was actually a bit too tall for the weight class. His 242-pound class competitors tended to be in the 5'6" to 5'8" range. International-level powerlifting is a game of leverage and density: there is the often overlooked pounds-of-muscle-per-inches-of-height ratio that explains why there are no 5'10" 175-pound world powerlifting champions. When Furnas allowed his bodyweight to rise to a full 275 pounds (sporting 9% bodyfat) his lifts shocked the world. He became one of the few men to achieve a total of 2400 pounds, in fact he is the third man in history to total 2400 (after Don Reinhoudt and Bill Kazmaier) and the first man ever to total 2400 pounds twice - all achieved at an astonishing 265-275 pound bodyweight. The first time, he totaled 2400 lbs (1088.6 kg) at the inaugural APF World Championships 1986 in Maui, Hawaii, squatting 986 lbs in an old squat suit, bench pressing 600 lbs in a loose size 60 bench shirt and deadlifting 814 lbs.

He achieved his second 2400+ total six months later on June 28, 1987, at the APF National Championships in Bloomington, Minnesota with a total of 2403 lbs (1090 kg) while competing in the 125 kg/275 lb weight class. This time deadlifting 826 lbs for a new personal record. Although he was arguably the most dominant 275 pound lifter in history, he ended his very short but incredible powerlifting career shortly afterwards in favor of professional wrestling. Furnas had set 29 powerlifting world records throughout his career. Furnas is known throughout the powerlifting world as one of the greatest squat technicians in history, eventually squatting 986 pounds. Although it was not widely known during his lifetime, Furnas was allergic to chalk, which prevented him from obtaining an optimal grip on his deadlifts. Furnas still holds the men's collegiate national records in the squat (400 kg/881.75 lb) and deadlift (347.5 kg/766 lb) in the 110 kg / 242 lb weight class, which he set on March 26, 1983, while attending the University of Tennessee. He also holds the Tennessee state records for the squat (986 lb), deadlift (826 lb), and total (2403 lbs).

Personal records
Done in official Powerlifting full meets with minimal supportive gear
 Squat - 986 lbs (447 kg) equipped
 Bench press - 600 lbs (272.2 kg) equipped
 Deadlift - 826 lbs (374.6 kg)
 Total - 2403 lbs (1090 kg) equipped

Professional wrestling career
Furnas began his career in Continental Championship Wrestling in late 1986, as a "guest" of the promotion during a card at the civic center in Knoxville, Tennessee. He watched promoter Bob Polk get assaulted by Kevin Sullivan, then the manager for the New Guinea Headhunters, until he could bear no more, and injected himself into the situation, effectively beginning his pro wrestling career.

During his run in Continental, Furnas feuded with Sullivan, Buddy Landell, and Sid Eudy's version of Lord Humongous, as well as Terry Gordy. In late 1989, Continental folded, and by that time, Furnas had left to spend time in All Japan Pro Wrestling and World Championship Wrestling.

Furnas briefly worked for World Championship Wrestling in 1990 as a member of a Sting-led group of fan favorites known as the "Dudes With Attitudes" as they feuded with the perennially dominant Four Horsemen stable, led by NWA World Heavyweight Champion Ric Flair.  Furnas' involvement in the stable saw him wrestle a short series of matches against Flair. In All Japan Pro Wrestling (AJPW), Furnas teamed with Dan Kroffat beginning in 1989. Together they formed The Can-Am Express. Furnas and Kroffat held the All Asia Tag Team Championship five times between June 1989 and September 1993 when they vacated the title so they could focus on the World Tag Team Championship. Their title match on May 25, 1992, against Kenta Kobashi and Tsuyoshi Kikuchi received five stars from the Wrestling Observer Newsletter and was also named "Match of the Year".

Also in 1992, the duo wrestled for Mexico's Universal Wrestling Association (UWA) as The Can-Am Connection. In Mexico, they held the UWA World Tag Team Championship twice, trading it with Los Villanos (Villano IV and Villano V).

The duo joined Extreme Championship Wrestling (ECW) in mid 1996 where they had a series of matches against Sabu and Rob Van Dam. A few months later, both men made their World Wrestling Federation debuts on November 17, 1996, at the Survivor Series pay-per-view. They feuded with Owen Hart and the British Bulldog and defeated them by disqualification at In Your House 13: Final Four but never captured the WWF World Tag Team titles. In the summer of 1997, Furnas and LaFon were in a car accident which kept them out of action for several months. They returned to WWF that fall where they appeared at Survivor Series (1997) teaming with Jim Neidhart and British Bulldog as Team Canada against Team USA: Vader, Goldust, Marc Mero and Steve Blackman. Furnas was able to eliminate Mero before he was eliminated by Vader. Bulldog would be the sole survivor. After Survivor Series, Furnas and LaFon would make a few more appearances mostly on Shotgun Saturday Night with one match being against the then-unknown Hardy Boyz before returning to ECW.

After failing to get over in WWF, they returned to ECW in late 1997, where they formed a stable of "invaders" from the WWF with Lance Wright, Brakkus and Droz. They won the ECW World Tag Team Title on December 5 from the F.B.I. Their reign would not last long, however, as they lost the belts to Chris Candido and Lance Storm the next day at Better Than Ever. Furnas went on wrestle Masato Tanaka in singles competition at Living Dangerously on March 1, 1998. Furnas came up on the losing end on this particular occasion. He also became one of Rob Van Dam's many unsuccessful challengers during Van Dam's record breaking ECW Television Championship run.

Retirement and death
Upon retiring, Furnas and his wife ran a group home in San Diego for abused boys. He would also raise bucking stock rodeo bulls in his family's farm.

Furnas's body was discovered on March 3, 2012, at his home in Tucson, Arizona; the precise date of his death could not be estimated by the medical examiner because of decomposition, but is presumed to have been sometime in February. He was 52 years old. The official cause of death was atherosclerotic and hypertensive heart disease. He had been battling Parkinson's disease for many years prior to his death. His death was confirmed by one of his sisters.

He was survived by his wife, parents, three sisters, one brother, and numerous nieces and nephews. He was divorced once.

Championships and accomplishments
All Japan Pro Wrestling
All Asia Tag Team Championship (5 times) with Dan Kroffat
 World's Strongest Tag Determination League New Wave Award (1989) with Dan Kroffat
 World's Strongest Tag Determination League Power Award (1991) with Dan Kroffat
Extreme Championship Wrestling
ECW World Tag Team Championship (1 time) with Phil Lafon
Pro Wrestling Illustrated
PWI ranked him # 138 of the 500 best singles wrestlers of the PWI 500 in 1997
PWI ranked him # 181 of the 500 best singles wrestlers during the "PWI Years" in 2003.
Pro Wrestling This Week
Wrestler of the Week (July 12–18, 1987)
Universal Wrestling Association
UWA World Tag Team Championship (2 times) with Dan Kroffat
USA Wrestling
USA Heavyweight Championship (1 time)
USA Tennessee Heavyweight Championship (1 time)
Wrestling Observer Newsletter
Match of the Year (1992) with Dan Kroffat vs. Kenta Kobashi and Tsuyoshi Kikuchi, Sendai, May 25

References

External links
 

1959 births
2012 deaths
ECW World Tag Team Champions
People from Commerce, Oklahoma
American male professional wrestlers
American powerlifters
Expatriate professional wrestlers in Japan
Professional wrestlers from Oklahoma
20th-century professional wrestlers
All Asia Tag Team Champions
UWA World Tag Team Champions